Charlie Ward (born 19 February 1995) is an English footballer who plays as a midfielder for USL Championship side Oklahoma City Energy.

Career

Youth
Ward played with the youth teams of both Aston Villa and Stoke City.

Professional
Ward signed with USL side Rio Grande Valley on 29 January 2016. On 19 July 2016, Ward signed a short-term loan deal with the Toros' MLS affiliate side Houston Dynamo, so he could compete for them in their upcoming Lamar Hunt Open Cup fixture against FC Dallas.

Ward joined Houston permanently on 1 July 2017. He was waived by Houston on 9 May 2018. He was signed by the USL's San Antonio on 8 June 2018.

Ward signed with Ottawa Fury FC on 18 January 2019.

Following Ottawa's decision to fold ahead of the 2020 season, Ward moved to fellow USL Championship side Oklahoma City Energy on 14 January 2020.

Honours
Aston Villa Under-19s
NextGen Series: 2012–13

References

External links

1995 births
Association football midfielders
English expatriate footballers
English footballers
Expatriate soccer players in the United States
Living people
Sportspeople from Redditch
Rio Grande Valley FC Toros players
Houston Dynamo FC players
San Antonio FC players
Ottawa Fury FC players
OKC Energy FC players
USL Championship players
Major League Soccer players
English expatriate sportspeople in the United States